The Jeremiah Cronkite House is a historic house located at 1095 Lynaugh Road in Victor, Ontario County, New York.

Description and history 
The house is an imposing Federal style cobblestone building constructed in about 1847. The two-story, 36 feet wide by 18 feet deep rectangular dwelling is constructed of smooth, glacial deposited gray and light brown cobblestones. Also on the property is a mid-to-late-19th century contributing barn.

It was listed on the National Register of Historic Places on February 5, 2002.

References

Houses on the National Register of Historic Places in New York (state)
Federal architecture in New York (state)
Cobblestone architecture
Houses completed in 1847
Houses in Ontario County, New York
1847 establishments in New York (state)
National Register of Historic Places in Ontario County, New York